The Weird World of Blowfly is a 2010 documentary film about rapper and hip hop musician Clarence Reid, a/k/a Blowfly, directed by Jonathan Furmanski.  In addition to Reid, the film features collaborators Tom Bowker and Otto von Schirach along with perspectives from Chuck D, Ice-T, and Die Ärzte.

References

External links

2010 films
Documentary films about hip hop music and musicians